Kombai Anwar is an academic and Tamil documentary filmmaker. His documentary Yaadhum, based on the history and cultural identity of Tamil Muslims, won the Bronze Remi Award at the 48th WorldFest-Houston International Film and Video Festival, USA. Yaadhum was also screened at The Hindu Literary Festival, Roja Muthiah Research Library, and ViBGYOR Film Festival.

References

Tamil-language film directors
Living people
Indian documentary filmmakers
Year of birth missing (living people)
Place of birth missing (living people)